Meet Me Halfway, at Least is the debut album from English rock band Deaf Havana. It was produced by Matt O'Grady and was released on 5 October 2009, through Wolf At Your Door Records. It was their second release via Wolf At Your Door following the EP It's Called the Easy Life. Music videos for the songs, "Friends Like These" and "Nicotine and Alcohol Saved My Life", gained them regular airtime on UK music channels Kerrang!, Scuzz and Lava. Following the release of the album, they toured UK and Europe, leading them to playing many popular UK festivals towards the second half of 2010 and a sellout tour of the UK in November 2010, which they co-headlined with American band There for Tomorrow.

It turned out to be the last release featuring screamer and co-founding member Ryan Mellor.

Track listing

Personnel
Ryan Mellor – Screamed vocals
James Veck-Gilodi – Guitar, clean vocals
Chris Pennells – Guitar
Lee Wilson – Bass
Tom Ogden – Drums, percussion

References

2009 debut albums
Deaf Havana albums